The 2000 United States presidential election in Colorado took place on November 7, 2000, and was part of the 2000 United States presidential election. Voters chose eight representatives, or electors to the Electoral College, who voted for president and vice president.

Colorado was won by Governor George W. Bush by an 8.36% margin of victory, although almost 7% of the electorate voted for third-party candidates. Nader's best performance in the state and indeed the nation was in San Miguel County where he received over 17.20% of the vote, a performance that remains the Green Party's second best performance in any county nationwide  after this record was bested in 2016 when Jill Stein carried 25% of the vote in Kalawao County, Hawaii. 

, this is the last election in which San Juan County, Gunnison County, Clear Creek County, Routt County, Eagle County, and La Plata County voted for a Republican presidential candidate, as well as the last time that Colorado voted to the right of many modern-day red and swing states, specifically Arizona, Arkansas, Florida, Louisiana, Missouri, Tennessee and West Virginia. Bush became the first Republican to win the White House without carrying Summit County since William Howard Taft in 1908.

Colorado was 1 of 14 states that Bill Clinton carried at least once that Gore, the sitting VP under Clinton in 2000, lost to Bush.

Results

Results by county

Counties that flipped from Democratic to Republican
Alamosa (Largest city: Alamosa)
Bent (Largest city: Las Animas)
Clear Creek (Largest city: Idaho Springs)
Conejos (Largest city: Manassa)
Eagle (Largest city: Edwards)
Gunnison (Largest city: Gunnison)
Mineral (Largest city: Creede)
Otero (Largest city: La Junta)
Routt (Largest city: Steamboat Springs)

By congressional district
Bush won four of six congressional districts.

Electors

Technically the voters of Colorado cast their ballots for electors: representatives to the Electoral College. Colorado is allocated 8 electors because it has 6 congressional districts and 2 senators. All candidates who appear on the ballot or qualify to receive write-in votes must submit a list of 8 electors, who pledge to vote for their candidate and his or her running mate. Whoever wins the majority of votes in the state is awarded all 8 electoral votes. Their chosen electors then vote for president and vice president. Although electors are pledged to their candidate and running mate, they are not obligated to vote for them. An elector who votes for someone other than his or her candidate is known as a faithless elector.

The electors of each state and the District of Columbia met on December 18, 2000 to cast their votes for president and vice president. The Electoral College itself never meets as one body. Instead the electors from each state and the District of Columbia met in their respective capitols.

The following were the members of the Electoral College from the state. All were pledged to and voted for George W. Bush and Dick Cheney:
Bob Beauprez
Marcy Benson
Robert Dieter
Mary Hergert
Robert Martinez
Ralph Nagel
Lilly Nunez
Joe Rogers

References

2000
Colorado
2000 Colorado elections